Hankaar, Hankār or Ahankar 
(), is the Gurmukhi word originated from a Sanskrit word Ahankāra (Hindi or Sanskrit: अहंकार) which translates to mean ego or excessive pride due to one's possessions, material wealth, spirituality,  beauty, talents,  physical strength, intelligence, authoritative powers, charity work etc. It gives an individual the feeling that he is superior to others and therefore they are at a lower level than he is. It leads to envy, feelings of enmity, and restlessness amongst people. 
It occurs in a person only when the person is in देह बुद्धि i.e. when he consider himself a 'body' only (as a soul, we possess body). So, ahemkaar is a product of अस्मिता loss of true identity.

Sikhism requires that a person serves society and community with Nimrata or humility. This is obtained by Sewa and hence, one sees the practice of devotees cleaning the footwear of visitors to a Gurdwara so that the mind of devout Sikh is made more humble.

This Cardinal Evil is often regarded by Sikhs as the worst of the Five Evils. 
They feel that pride leads to Haumai because it makes people believe that they are the most important thing in life and leads to self-centredness.

The following Shabads from Gurbani clarify this cardinal vice:

 The world is drunk, engrossed in sexual desire, anger and egotism. (Guru Granth Sahib Page 51 line 2070)
 Renounce sexual desire, anger, falsehood and slander;  forsake Maya and eliminate egotistical pride. (Guru Granth Sahib Page 141 line 5766)
 The duality of Maya dwells in the consciousness of the people of the world. They are destroyed by sexual desire, anger and egotism. ((1)) (Guru Granth Sahib Page 223 line 9561)
 They complain about other peoples' faults, while their own self-conceit only increases. (Guru Granth Sahib Page 366 line 16693)
 In the Saadh Sangat, the Company of the Holy, redeem your mind, and adore the Lord, twenty-four hours a day. Sexual desire, anger and egotism will be dispelled, and all troubles shall end. ((2)) (Guru Granth Sahib Page 501 line 22390)

References

Sikh terminology